The Princess of Nebraska is a 2007 film directed by Wayne Wang. It stars Li Ling and Brian Danforth. It was adapted from a story by Yiyun Li.

Premise
A pregnant San Francisco Chinese teenage immigrant named Sasha tells of life in America.

Cast
Li Ling as Sasha
Brian Danforth as Boshen
Minghua Tan as May
Zhi Hao Li as Driver
Hiep Thi Le as Mother at mall

Reception
A.O. Scott of The New York Times gave a positive review saying "Moments of obviousness are offset by a feeling of gritty lyricism in Wayne Wang's "Princess of Nebraska," a beautifully shot but awkwardly acted movie."

References

External links
 

2007 films
Films about Chinese Americans
Films directed by Wayne Wang
Films about abortion
Films based on short fiction
2007 drama films
Films about immigration to the United States
Asian-American drama films
2000s English-language films
2000s American films